Sri Pravarasena (reigned c. 530-590 CE), also sometimes Pravarasena II based on the regnal lists of the Rajatarangini, was a 6th-century  Gupta Lineage Grandchild of Chandragupta ll from His daughter Prabhavati Gupta king in the area of Gandhara and Kashmir in northwestern India. His reign probably lasted about 60 years from about the year 530 CE.

According to Kalhana's 12th century text Rajatarangini, a king named Pravarasena II established a new capital named Pravarapura (also known as Pravarasena-pura). Based on topographical details, Pravarapura appears to be same as the modern city of Srinagar. Aurel Stein dates the king to 6th century. He also built a temple named "Pravaresha".

Sri Pravarasena and Guptas is thought as the most likely ruler to have succeeded after defeating the Alchon Huns Mihirakula in the area of Kashmir Gandhara,  Mihirakula was son of Toramana. Mihirakula was spared by Skanda Gupta as per His mother's order not to kill the enemy in vanga region, Mihirakula fled to Kashmir, here he was defeated by Gupta's.

Pravarasena was probably succeeded by a king named Gokarna, a follower of Shiva, and then by his son king Narendraditya Khinkhila. The son of Narendraditya was Yudhishthira, .

References

6th-century Indian monarchs
Converts to Hinduism
History of Kashmir
Hephthalites
History of Pakistan
Year of birth unknown
590 deaths
Place of birth missing